Little Men is a 1934 American feature film based on Louisa May Alcott's 1871 novel Little Men, starring Ralph Morgan and Erin O'Brien-Moore, directed by Phil Rosen, and was released by Mascot Pictures. Alcott wrote Little Men in response to her prior novel, Little Women, hoping to achieve the same level of success.   It is a sequel to Little Women (1933 film)

Plot
The former Jo March (O'Brien-Moore), now married to Prof. Bhaer (Morgan), opens a boarding school for wayward boys. One day, a boy by the name of Nat Blake arrives at the house and is taken in by the Bhaers. Nat is soft-spoken, compassionate, respectful, and bright. He is picked on by the kids at first but soon fits right in. One day while riding back from a birthday party, Nat sees one of his homeless friends, Dan. He invites Dan back to the house, assuming that the Bhaers can take him in as they did himself. Although Professor Bhaer is hesitant due to the fact that Dan is older than all of the other boys in the house, Jo refuses to let Dan continue to live on the streets and insists that he stay. Dan, unlike Nat, is rude, arrogant, careless, and selfish. He quickly earns a bad name for himself by lying, getting into fights, smoking, and starting fires.

The boys in the house begin to resent Dan, but the Bhaers keep giving him second chances, knowing that deep down he has a good heart. One day, a dollar gets stolen from a boy named Tommy. Even though Dan is the trouble maker, everyone thinks it’s Nat, because he lied in the past about another incident. Some of the boys try to bully Nat into confessing, and Dan acts as Nat’s bodyguard due to their close friendship. In order to prevent Nat from further pestering, Dan goes to the streets to sell newspapers and get Tommy’s dollar back. When Dan tries to return the money anonymously, he is caught and thought to be the thief.

Professor Bhaur sends Dan to a much stricter alternative orphanage. Dan ends up escaping shortly after arriving and goes missing. Meanwhile at Plumfield, a boy, Dick, gets extremely sick and dies. The orphanage comes together in mourning and a note is left by a boy named Jack saying that he stole Tommy’s dollar and he’s never coming back. Realizing that he made a mistake, Professor Bhaer tries to bring Dan back, but he is nowhere to be found. The boys realize how much they miss Dan, and how he made their lives fun and exciting. After a couple of weeks, Dan returns to Plumfield and everyone is united and happy once again.

Response 
The film received slight criticism due to high expectations from Alcott's prior novel, Little Women. Although the film was considered by some to be a sequel to Little Women, it didn't contain the same message about the domesticity of women and their roles in society, and therefore did not have as big of an impact.

While most critics deemed Little Men as a wholesome depiction of childhood that appealed to all audiences with its moments of sympathy, drama, and humor, some disagreed. The Motion Picture Reviews written by The Women's University Club called it less interesting and less important than Little Women. The film was also praised for its child actors. The Film Daily called it the biggest cast of juvenile actors assembled in a feature which included names like Frankie Darro, Junior Durkin, and David Durand.

Cast
Ralph Morgan as Prof. Bhaer
Erin O'Brien-Moore as Jo March Bhaer
Junior Durkin as Franz
Cora Sue Collins as Daisy
Phyllis Fraser as Mary Anne
Frankie Darro as Dan
David Durand as Nat Blake
Dickie Moore as Demi
Tad Alexander as Jack 
Buster Phelps as Dick
Ronnie Cosby as Rob Bhaer
Tommy Bupp as Tommy Bangs
Bobby Cox as Stuffy
Dickie Jones as Dolly
Richard Quine as Ned
Donald Buck as Billy
Eddie Dale Heiden as Teddy Bhaer
George Ernest as Emil
Irving Bacon as Silas (uncredited)
Hattie McDaniel as Asia (uncredited)
Gustav von Seyffertitz as Schoolmaster Page (uncredited)

References

External links

1934 films
American drama films
American black-and-white films
Films set in boarding schools
Films based on American novels
1934 drama films
Films produced by Nat Levine
Films based on works by Louisa May Alcott
Works based on Little Women
Little Men
Films directed by Phil Rosen
1930s English-language films
1930s American films